Joseph John Rosenthal (October 9, 1911 – August 20, 2006) was an American photographer who received the Pulitzer Prize for his iconic World War II photograph Raising the Flag on Iwo Jima, taken during the 1945 Battle of Iwo Jima. His picture became one of the best-known photographs of the war, and was replicated as the United States Marine Corps War Memorial in Arlington, Virginia.

Early life
Joseph Rosenthal was born on October 9, 1911, in Washington, D.C. His parents were Russian-Jewish immigrants; he converted to Catholicism during his youth. He had four brothers. His interest in photography started as a hobby during the Great Depression. He graduated from McKinley High School in 1929, and after working as an office boy, he moved to San Francisco where he became a reporter-photographer for The San Francisco News in 1932.

World War II 
Rosenthal was rejected by the U.S. Army as a photographer because of poor eyesight. In 1941, he attended the University of San Francisco and joined the staff of the Associated Press (AP). In 1943, he joined the United States Maritime Service as a photographer and served as a warrant officer documenting life aboard ship in the British Isles and North Africa. In 1944, he rejoined the Associated Press and followed the United States Army and U.S. Marine Corps in the Pacific Theater of Operations as a war correspondent at Hollandia, New Guinea, Guam, Peleliu, Angaur, and Iwo Jima.

Flag-raising photo 

On Friday morning, February 23, 1945, four days after the Marines landed at Iwo Jima, Rosenthal was making his daily visit to the island on a Marine landing craft when he heard that an American flag was being raised atop Mount Suribachi, a volcano at the southern tip of the island. Upon landing, Rosenthal hurried toward Suribachi, lugging along his bulky Speed Graphic camera, the standard for press photographers at the time. Together with Marine combat still photographer Pvt. Bob Campbell and Marine color movie photographer Sgt. Bill Genaust, he began the climb up to the summit of Mount Suribachi. When they got about halfway up, they met Staff Sgt. Louis Lowery, a photographer with the Marine publication "Leatherneck" who was coming down the volcano after an enemy grenade explosion on top had knocked him off his feet and broke his camera. Lowery told them that the flag had already been raised at 10:40 am, and he had gotten photos of the flag on the summit. Lowery told them the view was good from the summit, and Rosenthal convinced Genaust and Campbell to continue to take him to the top with them since they were armed.

On the high and windy summit of Mount Suribachi, Rosenthal discovered a group of Marines attaching a large flag to a length of steel pipe. Nearby, he saw the smaller flag flying and managed to get himself photoed by Campbell under the flag with Sgt. Genaust and Army Pfc. George Burn, a photographer for Yank Magazine. Another group of Marines was getting ready to lower the smaller flag at the same instant the larger flag was raised under an officer's orders. Rosenthal briefly contemplated attempting to photograph both of the flags at once, but was not in a position to get both flags in the photograph (Pvt. Campbell did capture an image of the first flag coming down while the second flag was going up), so he focused his attention on the group of men preparing to raise the second flag.

Rosenthal piled stones and a sandbag so he had something on which to stand, as he was only 5 feet and 5 inches (1.65 m) tall. He set his camera for a lens setting between f/8 and f/11 and the shutter speed at 1/400th second. Then, out of the corner of his eye, he saw six Marines start to raise the second flag. He swung his camera around toward the action and pushed the shutter. Three feet to his right, Sgt. Genaust captured the flag-raising from nearly the same angle using color motion picture film. To make sure he had a worthwhile photo to send to the AP, Rosenthal took another black and white photograph showing four of the second flag-raisers steadying the flagstaff and waiting for the bottom of the pipe to be more secured with rocks; and afterwards a rope. When that was done, Rosenthal gathered a group of sixteen Marines and two Navy corpsmen around the base of the flagstaff for a posed shot (called the "Gung Ho" photo) which included First Lieutenant Harold Schrier, the only officer on the summit, who had volunteered to take the 40-man patrol up Mount Suribachi that morning to seize and occupy the crest and raise the battalion's flag.

Impact of flag-raising photo 

The American people saw Rosenthal's photo as a potent symbol of victory. Wire services flashed what would become a Pulitzer Prize–winning photograph around the world in time to appear in the Sunday newspapers on February 25, 1945 (Lowery's photos weren't released until late 1947). Many magazines ran the photo on their covers. After the battle for Iwo Jima was over and won, the photo was used for posters in war bond drives through over 30 cities from May 11 through July 4, 1945, which raised $26.3 billion.

Rosenthal's photograph became an enduring icon. Artists used the photo as a model for the United States Marine Corps War Memorial (1954) — commonly referred to as "The Iwo Jima Memorial" — at Arlington, Virginia, and the U.S. Postal Service commemorated the photo on a U.S. postage stamp. A version of the Marine Corps memorial also stands on the parade ground at Marine Corps Recruit Depot Parris Island, South Carolina.

The International Museum of Photography and Film in Rochester, New York, displays the camera used by Rosenthal to take the photograph.

Later years and death 
In later years, when asked about the photo, he would say "I took the picture; the Marines took Iwo Jima."
Rosenthal left the AP later in 1945 and became the chief photographer and manager of Times Wide World Photos. He later joined the San Francisco Chronicle. He worked there as a photographer for 35 years, before retiring in 1981. His name was inscribed (across from the memorial sculptor Felix de Weldon's name) on the bottom right side of the front (west side) of the Marine Corps War Memorial in 1982. On April 13, 1996, Rosenthal was named an honorary Marine by then Commandant of the Marine Corps General Charles C. Krulak.

On August 20, 2006, at age 94, Rosenthal died of natural causes in his sleep at a center for assisted living in Novato, California, located in the North Bay region of the San Francisco Bay Area, in northern Marin County. Rosenthal was cremated. A Marine Corps ceremony that was open to the public was held for him at the Marines' Memorial Club on September 15 and a Catholic funeral mass was held for him on September 16, 2006, at St. Emydius Catholic Church, both located in San Francisco, California.

Awards and honors
 Pulitzer Prize – Rosenthal received the Pulitzer Prize in 1945 for the iconic photo. The committee noted that photo as "depicting one of the war's great moments," a "frozen flash of history."
 International Photography Hall of Fame, St. Louis, Missouri
 Navy Distinguished Public Service Award – The United States Marine Corps posthumously awarded Rosenthal the Distinguished Public Service Award (medal) on September 15, 2006:

Citation:

Legacy 

The 2006 Hollywood film Flags of Our Fathers, directed by Clint Eastwood, tells the stories of the American flag raisers who raised the famous flag on Mount Suribachi and depicts Rosenthal's involvement in the events that led up to his taking the iconic flag raising photograph. Rosenthal was portrayed by actor Ned Eisenberg in the film.

Reporters extensively interviewed Rosenthal after September 11, 2001, when Thomas E. Franklin shot a similar iconic photograph, Ground Zero Spirit, depicting the raising of the flag by three firefighters at the World Trade Center. Rosenthal and Franklin met several times after the event.

References

Further reading

External links

Flag Raising Photo Not Posed
History of the Flag-Raising on Iwo Jima
This is America – Iwo Jima statue
1-400th of a second shot – story highlighted in numbers
Joe Rosenthal: 1911–2006

1911 births
2006 deaths
Artists from Washington, D.C.
20th-century American photographers
American Roman Catholics
War photographers
Battle of Iwo Jima
Photography in Japan
Pulitzer Prize for Photography winners
University of San Francisco alumni
American people of Russian-Jewish descent
Converts to Roman Catholicism from Judaism
Recipients of the Navy Distinguished Public Service Award
Associated Press photographers
Commandeurs of the Ordre des Arts et des Lettres